Itaswi is an administrative ward in the Kondoa district of the Dodoma Region of Tanzania. According to 2012 census, the ward has a total population of 9774  people.

References
 

Dodoma Region
Kondoa District